Uncial 0275 (in the Gregory-Aland numbering), is a Greek-Coptic uncial manuscript of the New Testament. Paleographically it has been assigned to the 7th century.

Description 

The codex contains a small part of the Gospel of Matthew 5:25-26,29-30, on 1 parchment leaf (28 cm by 25 cm). Written in two columns per page, 12 lines per page, in uncial letters.

Currently it is dated by the INTF to the 7th century.

Text 
The Greek text of this codex probably is a representative of the Alexandrian text-type. Aland placed it with hesitation in Category II. It was collated by A. Passoni in 1980.

Location 
After its discovery it was held in Cairo. Currently the codex is housed at Trinity College Dublin (TCD PAP F 138).

See also 

 List of New Testament uncials
 Coptic versions of the Bible
 Textual criticism

References

Further reading 

 Anna Passoni dell'Acqua, "Aegyptus", 60 (1980), pp. 102-106. 

Greek New Testament uncials
7th-century biblical manuscripts
Greek-Coptic diglot manuscripts of the New Testament